Lotte Corporation is a South Korean multinational conglomerate corporation, and the fifth-largest chaebol in South Korea. Lotte began its history on June 28, 1948, by Korean businessman Shin Kyuk-ho in Tokyo. Shin expanded Lotte to his ancestral country, South Korea, with the establishment of Lotte Confectionery in Seoul on April 3, 1967.

Lotte Corporation consists of over 90 business units employing 60,000 people engaged in such diverse industries as candy manufacturing, beverages, hotels, fast food, retail, financial services, industrial chemicals, electronics, IT, construction, publishing, and entertainment. Lotte runs additional businesses in China, Thailand, Malaysia, Indonesia, Vietnam, Cambodia, Uzbekistan, India, United States, United Kingdom, Kazakhstan, Russia, Philippines, Myanmar, Pakistan, Poland (Lotte bought Poland's largest candy company Wedel from Kraft Foods in June 2010), Australia and New Zealand (Lotte successfully bought 4 duty-free stores in Australia and 1 in New Zealand from JR/Group in 2019).

History 
Lotte was founded in June 1948, by Korean businessman Shin Kyuk-ho in Tokyo, Japan, two years after he graduated from Waseda Jitsugyo High School. Originally called Lotte Co., Ltd, the company has grown from selling chewing gum to children in post-war Japan to becoming a major multinational corporation.

Name 
The source of the company's name is neither Korean nor Japanese, or even Chinese, but German. Shin Kyuk-ho was impressed with Johann Wolfgang von Goethe's The Sorrows of Young Werther (1774) and named his newly founded company Lotte after the character Charlotte in the novel. ("Charlotte" is also the name of premium auditoriums in movie theatres run by Lotte.)

Operations 

Lotte Corporation – is located in Songpa-gu, Seoul and Lotte Holdings Co., Ltd. in Shinjuku, Tokyo. It is controlled by the founder Shin Kyuk-Ho's extended family.

Business 
Lotte Group's major businesses are food, retail, chemical, construction, manufacturing, tourism, service, finance, etc.

 Food: Lotte Confectionery, Lotte Chilsung, Lotte Liquor, Lotte Nestle, Lotte Asahi Liquor, Lotte GRS, and others.
 Retail: Lotte Department Store, Lotte Shopping, Lotte Hi-Mart, Lotte Super, Lotte On, Lotter Korea Seven, FRL Korea, and others.
 Chemical/construction/manufacturing: Lotte Construction, Lotte Chemical, Lotte Fine Chemical, Lotte MCC, Lotte E&C, Lotte Aluminium, Lotte Ineos Chemical, Korea Fujifilm, and others.
 Tourism/service/finance: Lotte Global Logistics, Lotte Rental, Lotte Resort, Lotte Duty Free, Lotte World, Lotte Property & Development, Lotte Capital, Lotte Hotels & Resorts, Lotte Giants, Daehong Communications, Lotte Hotel Busan, Lotte International, and others

Sports 
Lotte also owns professional baseball teams.

 Lotte Giants in Busan, South Korea (1982–present).

Lotte R&D Center 

 Korea R&D Center : 201, Magokjungang-ro, Gangseo-gu Seoul, South Korea

Controversies 
In June 2016, companies of the group were raided by South Korean prosecutors, investigating into a possible slush fund as well as breach of trust involving transactions among the group's companies.  The investigation forced its Hotel Lotte unit to abandon an initial public offering and Lotte Chemical Corp to withdraw from bidding for Axiall Corp.  Vice chairman, Lee In-won, was found dead in August same year.  He was suspected of suicide just hours before being questioned by prosecutors. Lee was considered the top lieutenant of Chairman Shin Dong-bin.

See also 

 Lotte World Tower
 Shin Dong-bin, also known as Akio Shigemitsu
 Chaebol

References

External links 

  (Korean)
  (English)

 
Chaebol
Multinational companies
Conglomerate companies established in 1967
Companies based in Seoul
South Korean brands
Companies listed on the Korea Exchange
South Korean companies established in 1967
Shin family